Degia is a genus of moths in the Psychidae family.

Species
Degia adunca Sobczyk, 2009
Degia bipunctata Sobczyk, 2009
Degia deficiens Walker, 1862
Degia diehli Sobczyk, 2009
Degia evagata (Meyrick, 1921)
Degia imparata Walker, 1862
Degia macrosoma Sobczyk, 2009
Degia pulverulenta Sobczyk, 2009
Degia subfusca Sobczyk, 2009
Degia sumatrensis Sobczyk, 2009

References

 , 1997: Degia Walker, 1862 und Mekla Swinhoe, 1892: Zwei orientalische Psychidae-Gattungen (Insecta, Lepidoptera). Spixiana 20 (3): 261-270.
  2009: Beiträge zur Kenntnis der orientalischen Psychidae (Lepidoptera) II. Revision der Degia-Gattungsgruppe sowie der Gattung Westia (Typhoniinae LEDERER, 1853) mit der Beschreibung neuer Gattungen und Arten. Entomofauna 30: 365-436. Full article: 
 , 2011: World Catalogue of Insects Volume 10 Psychidae (Lepidoptera): 1-467.

External links
Natural History Museum Lepidoptera generic names catalog

Psychidae
Psychidae genera